The 2nd constituency of the Puy-de-Dôme (French: Deuxième circonscription du Puy-de-Dôme) is a French legislative constituency in the Puy-de-Dôme département. Like the other 576 French constituencies, it elects one MP using a two-round electoral system.

Description

Pu-de-Dôme had six constituencies through to 2010, then at the 2010 Redistricting of French Legislative Constituencies, the department's allocation was reduced to five.  Much of the areas of the former sixth constituency was moved into the new second constituency.
From 2010, the 2nd constituency of the Puy-de-Dôme covers the northern section of the department including the town of Riom.

At the 2017 election the seat was one of only a few in France that re-elected a Socialist Party deputy.

Assembly Members
Valéry Giscard d'Estaing

Election results

2022

 
 
 
 
 
|-
| colspan="8" bgcolor="#E9E9E9"|
|-

2017

|- style="background-color:#E9E9E9;text-align:center;"
! colspan="2" rowspan="2" style="text-align:left;" | Candidate
! rowspan="2" colspan="2" style="text-align:left;" | Party
! colspan="2" | 1st round
! colspan="2" | 2nd round
|- style="background-color:#E9E9E9;text-align:center;"
! width="75" | Votes
! width="30" | %
! width="75" | Votes
! width="30" | %
|-
| style="background-color:" |
| style="text-align:left;" | Mohand Hamoumou
| style="text-align:left;" | La République En Marche!
| LREM
| 
| 29.87
| 
| 36.79
|-
| style="background-color:" |
| style="text-align:left;" | Christine Pirès Beaune
| style="text-align:left;" | Socialist Party
| PS
| 
| 27.27
| 
| 63.21
|-
| style="background-color:" |
| style="text-align:left;" | Pascal Estier
| style="text-align:left;" | La France Insoumise
| FI
| 
| 15.72
| colspan="2" style="text-align:left;" |
|-
| style="background-color:" |
| style="text-align:left;" | Stéphanie Flori-Dutour
| style="text-align:left;" | The Republicans
| LR
| 
| 12.68
| colspan="2" style="text-align:left;" |
|-
| style="background-color:" |
| style="text-align:left;" | Stanislas Chavelet
| style="text-align:left;" | National Front
| FN
| 
| 10.55
| colspan="2" style="text-align:left;" |
|-
| style="background-color:" |
| style="text-align:left;" | Doris Valour
| style="text-align:left;" | Debout la France
| DLF
| 
| 1.49
| colspan="2" style="text-align:left;" |
|-
| style="background-color:" |
| style="text-align:left;" | Franck Truchon
| style="text-align:left;" | Far Left
| EXG
| 
| 1.00
| colspan="2" style="text-align:left;" |
|-
| style="background-color:" |
| style="text-align:left;" | Christine Bourdier Buisson
| style="text-align:left;" | Miscellaneous Left
| DVG
| 
| 0.83
| colspan="2" style="text-align:left;" |
|-
| style="background-color:" |
| style="text-align:left;" | Henri Knauf
| style="text-align:left;" | Independent
| DIV
| 
| 0.60
| colspan="2" style="text-align:left;" |
|-
| colspan="8" style="background-color:#E9E9E9;"|
|- style="font-weight:bold"
| colspan="4" style="text-align:left;" | Total
| 
| 100%
| 
| 100%
|-
| colspan="8" style="background-color:#E9E9E9;"|
|-
| colspan="4" style="text-align:left;" | Registered voters
| 
| style="background-color:#E9E9E9;"|
| 
| style="background-color:#E9E9E9;"|
|-
| colspan="4" style="text-align:left;" | Blank ballots
| 
| 1.60%
| 
| 5.71%
|-
| colspan="4" style="text-align:left;" | Void ballots
| 
| 0.86%
| 
| 3.53%
|-
| colspan="4" style="text-align:left;" | Turnout
| 
| 53.63%
| 
| 49.46%
|-
| colspan="4" style="text-align:left;" | Abstentions
| 
| 46.37%
| 
| 50.54%
|-
| colspan="8" style="background-color:#E9E9E9;"|
|- style="font-weight:bold"
| colspan="6" style="text-align:left;" | Result
| colspan="2" style="background-color:" | PS HOLD
|}

2012

|- style="background-color:#E9E9E9;text-align:center;"
! colspan="2" rowspan="2" style="text-align:left;" | Candidate
! rowspan="2" colspan="2" style="text-align:left;" | Party
! colspan="2" | 1st round
! colspan="2" | 2nd round
|- style="background-color:#E9E9E9;text-align:center;"
! width="75" | Votes
! width="30" | %
! width="75" | Votes
! width="30" | %
|-
| style="background-color:" |
| style="text-align:left;" | Christine Pires Beaune
| style="text-align:left;" | Socialist Party
| PS
| 
| 38.77
| 
| 59.52
|-
| style="background-color:" |
| style="text-align:left;" | Lionel Muller
| style="text-align:left;" | Union for a Popular Movement
| UMP
| 
| 26.39
| 
| 40.48
|-
| style="background-color:" |
| style="text-align:left;" | Pascal Estier
| style="text-align:left;" | Left Front
| FG
| 
| 14.14
| colspan="2" style="text-align:left;" |
|-
| style="background-color:" |
| style="text-align:left;" | Gérald Perignon
| style="text-align:left;" | National Front
| FN
| 
| 11.13
| colspan="2" style="text-align:left;" |
|-
| style="background-color:" |
| style="text-align:left;" | Anne-Marie Regnoux
| style="text-align:left;" | Democratic Movement
| MoDem
| 
| 3.03
| colspan="2" style="text-align:left;" |
|-
| style="background-color:" |
| style="text-align:left;" | Agnès Mollon
| style="text-align:left;" | Europe Ecology – The Greens
| EELV
| 
| 2.64
| colspan="2" style="text-align:left;" |
|-
| style="background-color:" |
| style="text-align:left;" | Gisèle Dupre
| style="text-align:left;" | New Centre
| NC
| 
| 2.17
| colspan="2" style="text-align:left;" |
|-
| style="background-color:" |
| style="text-align:left;" | Dominique Leclair
| style="text-align:left;" | Workers’ Struggle
| LO
| 
| 0.67
| colspan="2" style="text-align:left;" |
|-
| style="background-color:" |
| style="text-align:left;" | Jacques Montel
| style="text-align:left;" | Independent Ecological Alliance
| AEI
| 
| 0.57
| colspan="2" style="text-align:left;" |
|-
| style="background-color:" |
| style="text-align:left;" | Marie-Françoise Joët
| style="text-align:left;" | Independent Ecological Movement
| MEI
| 
| 0.49
| colspan="2" style="text-align:left;" |
|-
| style="background-color:" |
| style="text-align:left;" | Audrey Pierrot
| style="text-align:left;" | Autre
| AUT
| 
| 0.00
| colspan="2" style="text-align:left;" |
|-
| colspan="8" style="background-color:#E9E9E9;"|
|- style="font-weight:bold"
| colspan="4" style="text-align:left;" | Total
| 
| 100%
| 
| 100%
|-
| colspan="8" style="background-color:#E9E9E9;"|
|-
| colspan="4" style="text-align:left;" | Registered voters
| 
| style="background-color:#E9E9E9;"|
| 
| style="background-color:#E9E9E9;"|
|-
| colspan="4" style="text-align:left;" | Blank/Void ballots
| 
| 1.85%
| 
| 3.45%
|-
| colspan="4" style="text-align:left;" | Turnout
| 
| 62.08%
| 
| 61.53%
|-
| colspan="4" style="text-align:left;" | Abstentions
| 
| 37.92%
| 
| 38.47%
|-
| colspan="8" style="background-color:#E9E9E9;"|
|- style="font-weight:bold"
| colspan="6" style="text-align:left;" | Result
| colspan="2" style="background-color:" | PS HOLD
|}

Notes

References

2